The 18th Metro Manila Film Festival was held in 1992.

Screen heartthrob and matinée idol Aga Muhlach won his first major award, the Best Actor trophy for the film Bakit Labis Kitang Mahal. The movie also won three other awards including the Best Original Theme Song by the same title of the film for Alex Mallillin. Meanwhile, VIVA Films' Andres Manambit: Angkan ng Matatapang was adjudged the festival's Best Picture and won four other awards including the Best Director for Ike Jarlego, Jr. among others. Other awardees included Best Actress for Gina Alajar, Best Supporting Actress for Sylvia Sanchez and Best Child Performer for I.C. Mendoza. In addition, the year's festival introduced the new category for Best Float, received by the team of Okay Ka, Fairy Ko! Part 2 movie.

Entries

Winners and nominees

Awards
Winners are listed first and highlighted in boldface.

Special awards

Multiple awards and nominations

Ceremony information
The following are the key persons during the "Gabi ng Parangal" held in the PICC Reception Hall on December 28.
Hosts: Ricky Davao
Gretchen Barretto
Miguel Rodriguez
Maritoni Fernandez
Anchorperson: Ariel Ureta
Guest Performers:
Louie Reyes
Eugene Villaluz
Ding Mercado
Bobby Ongkiko Dancers
UP Concert Chorus
Melissa Gibbs
Janet Arnaiz
Donna Cruz
Jennifer Sevilla
Karen Timbol
Joey Palomar
Romnick Sarmenta
Ace Espinosa
Edgar Tejada
Jojo Abella
Nanette Inventor
Mitch Valdez
Rainmakers
Geneva Cruz
Timmy Cruz
Joey Ayala
Imelda Papin
Nora Aunor

Reception
Vice Mayor of Manila Lito Atienza criticized the festival for its "total commercialization" and losing its "reason of being, which is the promotion of good Filipino values through the arts."

References

External links

Metro Manila Film Festival
MMFF
MMFF